The discus throw is an athletic discipline.

Discus may also refer to:

Aviation
 Aeros Discus, a Ukrainian hang glider design
 Pegas Discus, a Czech two-place paraglider design
 Schempp-Hirth Discus, a German competition sailplane design

Other
 Discus (comics), a fictional character from the Marvel Comics Universe and enemy of Luke Cage
 Discus (fish), a freshwater fish popular with aquarium keepers 
 Discus (gastropod), a genus of snails in the family Discidae
 Discus intervertebralis, a cartilage between vertebrae
 DISCUS, a data compression algorithm
 Discus (website), a digital library for residents in South Carolina
 Discobolus, a Greek sculpture 
 Distilled Spirits Council of the United States, a national trade association representing producers and marketers of distilled spirits sold in the United States 
 Discus Awards, a U.S.-based national high school awards and recognition program
 Disqus a blog comment hosting service
 The Discus, an eating and debating club within the National Arts Club

See also
 Sudarshana Chakra, a weapon sometimes referred to as the discus of Vishnu
 Disc (disambiguation)
 Discuss

ro:Disc